Kare or KARE may refer to:
 Kare (Žitorađa), a village in Serbia
 Kare language, several languages with the name
 Kare (surname), a surname (including a list of people with the name)
 Kare Kauks (born 1961), Estonian singer
 Kåre or Kaare, a common Scandinavian given name
 KARE (TV), a television station in Minnesota, United States
 KAIR (AM), a radio station in Kansas, United States, which used the call sign KARE from 1939 to 1986

See also

 Kaare, Estonia, a village
 Kare-kare
Karey (disambiguation)
 Karie (disambiguation)
 Kil-Kare
 Care (disambiguation)
 Karre
 Kareh (disambiguation)